Tango is a soft drink originating, and primarily sold, in the United Kingdom and Ireland. It was first launched by Corona in 1950. Corona was purchased by the Beecham Group in 1958, and Corona Soft Drinks by Britvic in 1987.

, the flavours available in the United Kingdom include Orange, Apple, Strawberry and Watermelon and Tropical in addition to flavours of the "Tango Ice Blast" slush range. On 7 April, 2021 the UK range was extended to include sugar free Dark Berry. Tango is known in the United Kingdom for their advertisements, mostly those broadcast on television in the 1990s from the Howell Henry Chaldecott Lury advertising agency.

Advertising
Beginning in the late 1980s, surrealism was becoming a mainstream technique in advertising. Answering Tango's search for a new ad campaign, ad agency HHCL created the catchphrase "You know when you've been Tango'd". The campaign began in 1992 with the advert Orange Man; it featured a man drinking Tango and immediately being slapped around the face by a portly man painted orange (Peter Geeves). The advert received widespread condemnation after a craze for "Tangoing" people swept the nation's playgrounds, and there were reports of children receiving serious injuries, or even being deafened by being slapped on the ears.

Tango voluntarily replaced the "slapping" advert with an almost identical new version, where the orange clad person kisses the man instead of hitting him. The original version was ranked third in a list of "The 100 Greatest TV Ads", in a 2000 poll conducted by The Sunday Times and Channel 4.

Most subsequent Tango advertisements have avoided showing violence, except for the advert from October 2004, "Pipes", which showed a man rolling down a hill with concrete pipes, causing it to be banned, and the advert from March 1997, "Vote Orange Now", where the orange clad man made another appearance, slapping the advert's protagonist several times. This latter advert was featured in the first advert break on Channel 5.

In March 2000, an advert originally produced in 1998, which depicted a pre-fame James Corden being bullied for not drinking Tango, was banned because it was seen as encouraging the bullying of overweight children. The replacement was a satirically inoffensive advert, Drink Tango: It's Nice.

During August 1999, Tango teamed up with the newspapers Daily Mail and Daily Record to extend their summer peak sales period in a campaign called "Tango Time". The main thread of the campaign activity was a competition where a time of day is printed on the base of cans of Tango. The winning 'Tango Time' was published in the Daily Mirror and Daily Record and winners invited to call a prize claim line. The newspaper adverts were trailed by branding on the front page, including a free offer for a bottle of Tango. The adverts containing the winning 'Tango Time' ran for twenty six days in August 1999.

Tango Apple has often been subject to experimental advertising including an "Apple Tango Calendar" given free in June 1996 with the Daily Star and, in 2003, the "Big Drench Tour", a roadshow of a thirty foot tall apple shaped installation filled with water. Players must stand underneath and take part in a game of 'drench roulette' to win prizes.

Later that year, as Tango Strange Soda launched, three ultimately unsuccessful advertisements for the drink (Taste Buds, Trainers and Classroom) were aired featuring a man's "taste buddies" which are a group of young men behaving as the man's taste buds that vibrate rapidly when the man consumes Strange Soda. The "taste buddy" actors in the advertisements were shot as live action, with the actor standing on a moveable circular frame which was then manoeuvred via a handle to give the "vibrating" trembling effect for each of the "buddies" seen on screen.

In August 2009, a billboard campaign extolled the "weird and wonderful" side effects of drinking too much "Tango with added Tango Orange" (such as "Too much Tango made me suck a bull's udder"). The British press pointed out that the initials of "Tango With Added Tango" spelled the insult "twat" when read vertically, and this was later revealed to be intentional.

Tango advertisements have sometimes featured phone numbers for viewers to call, although the phone numbers would typically appear too briefly on the screen for viewers to type in the number or write it down. Many of these advertisements incorporate a send-away prize, including a rubber doll or a clown horn (the Tango Horn).

A notable exception was an advert which first premièred in 1993 for Still Tango disguised as a subvert falsely alerting people that the drink is unauthorised, and features a phone number for 'affected' viewers to call. Tango sponsored the television show The Word in 1994 and the Underage Festival in 2010. Historically, slogans have included "You Taste the Tang in Tango Every Sparkling Sip You Take" in the 1960s and "The Whole Fruit" in the late 1980s.

Logos and packaging
The first packaging that Britvic introduced, upon buying the brand in 1987, featured the word 'Tango' on a circle with an orange background. In 1989, the cast, material and graphic design of the can changed considerably. No longer molded in the shape of a baked bean can in a non reusable steel material, Tango was now available in a recyclable aluminium composition, with an innovative new ring pull system. On the can itself, the word 'Tango' was featured inside an oval on a backdrop of half sliced oranges.
The design was often seen on display in the form of laminated stickers, in the shop windows of confectionery stores and newsagents. 1992 saw the packaging change again, with the 'Tango' logo depicted on the fruit the drink was flavoured with against a black background, with the flavour specified at the bottom.

In the beginning of 1996, Tango packaging changed again, with the words 'Tango' and the respective flavour written on something representing the drink (for example, an orange explosion for Tango Orange). Slight changes were made in 1997, adding more detail. In April 2002, another revamp occurred, with a more three dimensional logo. The design was dropped in 2007, although is still used by Tango Ice Blast. The Diet Tango Orange products from this era featured a grey background instead of a black one.

The summer of 2007 saw a much simpler logo and design, featuring the 'Tango' logo on top of a carved version of the fruit, with the flavour written in lower case at the bottom. Intended to help restore sales of Tango, it actually led to a further decline. May 2009 saw new packaging created by Blue Marlin Brand Design. It featured mashed up images of fruit and graffiti style type, and contributed to a rise in sales.

For limited edition variations of Tango, special packaging has sometimes been produced for them. Notably, the 'Tango Talk' rebrand of Tango Orange and Tango Apple featured a mobile phone in place of the flavour representation featured on regular versions of the flavours at the time. The 2009 larger can packaging of Tango Orange known as "Tango with Added Tango Orange" featured more oranges in the background. The same can be said for the 2010 "King Tango" Tango Orange bottles. More apples were used on the label for King Tango Apple and more cherries for King Tango Cherry. No changes to flavour was made only the size of the can or bottle.

The labelling of the short lived Tango Strange Soda featured a "strange" fruit with facial features, patterned after the name and flavour of the drink. "Tango Orange Sound System: Official Can", a 2010 repackaging of the notably large "Tango with Added Tango Orange" featured speakers on the can, in place of the mashed-up fruit. Both these large cans were advertised as "the first time Tango cans are larger". This is not true, as from 1991 until roughly 2000, all Tango flavours could be purchased in similar size larger cans. The large cans, at the initial 1991 launch, were called "King-Size".

During 2000, short lived 250ml bottles of Tango were introduced as part of a £42m campaign by Britvic, to market their drinks as being suitable for children's lunch boxes. The campaign also introduced the popular Robinson's line of juice drinks Fruit Shoot.

Tango Cherry and Tango Lemon were first to feature the revamp of 2002, getting the treatment in September 2001.

Flavours and variants
In addition to orange, Tango has been sold in numerous flavours. Tango Lemon was introduced in the 1950s, and more recent flavours have included apple in the 1980s, and blackcurrant and cherry in the 1990s. A range of Diet Tango products were released in the 1990s, later branded as "Tango No Added Sugar". Some variants are still sold, but most have been discontinued. Tango Clear was also available for a limited time before being discontinued in 2007. The orange flavour was the only original flavour, and for this reason is the flagship flavour of the brand. As well as drinks, the brand have also sold two different chocolate bars, and chewy ball sweets.

There have been two product recalls of the drink throughout its long history. In June 1994, the brand recalled more than a million bottles of Still Tango, after complaints that the drink was fermenting on the shelves. The drink was not relaunched until September 1995. Then, on 25 August 2005, over 100,000 cans of Tango Cherry and Tango Fruit Fling were recalled over fears they could explode due to an ingredient in the drink.

In July 2011, Turbo Tango, when launched, was described as the "first aerosol drink". In October 2000, Tango introduced a flavoured bar of Crunchie. During 2011, several flavours of Chew Stick and Chewy Bonbons were introduced. In January 2013, a Tango branded shower gel was launched. A Tango branded hand soap was also launched around the same time.

Blackcurrant Tango

Blackcurrant Tango was launched in 1996. The drink is notable for the multiple award-winning television commercial from 1997, St George, which was used to promote it. Blackcurrant Tango was relaunched in August 2011, as an exclusive flavour to Asda, and since December 2012, is sold by other retailers.

For the launch of Blackcurrant Tango in 1996, HHCL produced the "St. George" television and cinema advertisement. In the advertisement, a member of Tango's customer service staff, Ray Gardner, provides a response to a letter of complaint about the flavour of Blackcurrant Tango he has received from Sebastien Loyes, a French exchange student. The letter prompts an increasingly jingoistic tirade during which Ray Gardner removes his suit to reveal bright purple boxing shorts. In one seemingly continuous take, he walks from his office, marches out of Tango's building, and is joined by a flag waving crowd as he enters a boxing ring.

As the camera pulls back, the ring is revealed to be perched on the edge of the White Cliffs of Dover. As the camera circles, Gardner can be heard shouting, "Come on France, Europe, the world. I'll take you all on! I'm Ray Gardner. I drink Blackcurrant Tango. Come and get me!" whilst three Harrier jump jets with purple landing lights hover in the background.

The advertisement was notable for the use of digital editing to seamlessly merge a number of tracking shots, including the final transition from a sky camera to a helicopter shot. Ray Gardner later won the ITV Best Actor in a Commercial award for his performance. The commercial was voted the Best Long Commercial (1956–2001), by the United Kingdom's Film4 television channel in June 2007. The song that appeared in the advertisement, "Don't You Want Me" by Felix, was rereleased with Tango branding.

Current flavours
 Orange
 Apple 
 Dark Berry
 Berry Peachy

Limited editions
 Paradise Punch (2023)
 Peach & Pomegranate (2019)
 Sour Watermelon (2018)
 Dark Cherry (2015-2016) (coincided with The Last Jedi release)
 Berry Peachy (Tango Editions)

Summer Flavour Festival (2015)
 Citrus
 Tropical
 Strawberry & Kiwi

Summer Flavour Festival (2016)
 Pina Coco'lada
 Lemon Fizz
 Pineapple
 Punchy Peach and Passionfruit

References

External links
 

1950 establishments in the United Kingdom
Fruit sodas
Orange sodas
Products introduced in 1950